Parth Bhalerao (born 30 May 2000) is an Indian actor. He started his acting career with the Marathi film Upside Down (Khalti Doka Varti Paay)
but his first released film in Hindi is the 2014 Bollywood film Bhoothnath Returns, co-starring Amitabh Bachchan, for which he received critical acclaim.

At the 62nd National Film Awards, he received Special Mention for his roles in Killa and Bhoothnath Returns, "For lovable portrayals with rare aplomb of an impish and caring child in both Killa and Bhootnath Returns".  Killa won the Best Feature Film in Marathi Award

He lives in Pune, where he studies at S. P College. He joined theater in New English school Ramanbaug under the guidance of his teacher Mr. Satpute. He also acts in Satpute's theatre group play, Kollage Creations.

Filmography

Television
He was in Comedy Nights with kapil as a guest along with Amitabh Bachchan and Boman Irani for one episode.

References

External links
 

2000 births
Living people
Indian male child actors
Male actors in Hindi cinema
Male actors in Marathi cinema
Male actors from Pune
Special Mention (feature film) National Film Award winners